Dihydroxy-E,Z,E-PUFA are metabolites of polyunsaturated fatty acids (PUFA) that possess two hydroxyl residues and three in series conjugated double bonds having the E,Z,E cis-trans configuration. These recently classified metabolites are distinguished from the many other dihydroxy-PUFA with three conjugated double bonds that do not have this critical E,Z,E configuration: they inhibit the function of platelets and therefore may be involved in controlling and prove useful for inhibiting human diseases which involve the pathological activation of these blood-borne elements.

Biochemistry 
Dihydroxy-E,Z,E-PUFA are metabolites of a) docosahexaenoic acid (DHA, i.e. 4Z,7Z,10Z,13Z,16Z,19Z-docosahexaenoic acid), b) α-Linolenic acid (ALA, i.e. 9Z,12Z,15Z-octadecatrienoic acid), an c) arachidonic acid (AA); E,Z,E-DHA and E,Z,E AA metabolites are termed poxytrins; ALA metabolites are termed linotrins. The first and perhaps most prominent member of this class of metabolites is protectin DX (PDX; i.e.  10R,17S-dihydroxy-4Z,7Z,11E,13Z,15E,19Z-docosahexaenoic acid). PDX is an isomer of (and sometimes confused with) neuroprotectin D1 (NPD1; i.e. 10R,17S-dihydroxy-4Z,7Z,11E,13E,15Z,19Z-doxahexaenoic acid; also termed protectin D1 [PD1]). NPD1 is structurally identical to PDX except that its three conjugated double bonds have the E,E,Z configuration as opposed to the E,Z,E configuration of PDX. Both compounds are members of the specialized proresolving mediators class of PUFA metabolites in that they possess potent anti-inflammatory activity; however, only PDX inhibited human platelet aggregation responses. Subsequent studies found that various other dihydroxy-E,Z,E-double bound-configured PUFA but not those with E,E,E or E,E,Z double bond configurations share with PDX anti-platelet activity. Cells make PDX by metabolizing DHA by double oxygenation a 15-lipoxygenase to form the 10R,17S-hydroxperoxy intermediated which is reduced its 10R,17S-hydroxyl product, PDX, probably by cytosolic GPX1 (i.e. glutathione peroxidase 1). Serial metabolism two different lipoxygenases or a lipoxygenase and a cytochrome P45) on PUFA possessing three double bonds in a 1Z,4Z,7Z configuration may also make a 1,7-dihydroxy 2E,4Z,6E product.

Other platelet-inhibiting dihydroxy-E,Z,E-PUFA are: 10R,17S-dihydroxy-4Z,7Z,11E,13Z,15E,19Z-docosahexaenoic acid (10R,17S-diHDHA); 8S,15S-dihydroxy-5Z,9E,11Z,13E-eicosatetraenoic acid (8S,15S-diHETE); 9S,16S-10E,12Z,14E-octadecatrienoic acid (linotrin-1); and 9R,16S-10E,12Z,14E-octadecatrienoic acid (linotrin-2). 10R,17S-diHDHA is the 10R diastereomer of PDX with the 10R hydroxyl residue being formed by aspirin-treated COX-2 or a cytochrome P450. Guinea pig tissues make 8S,15S-diHETE probably by double oxygenation of AA by a 15-lipoxygenase (probably ALOX15) or serial metabolism by two enzymes.  Linotrin-1 and linotrin-2 are among the four isomeric metabolites produced by incubating ALA with ALOX15B. The extent to which the linotrins form in cells or in vito is not clear.

Activity 
Stimulating agents such as collagen depend to platelets to make and release thromboxane A2 (TXA2) to mediate and/or enhance their aggregating activity. 10R,17S-diHDHA and to slightly lesser degrees 10R,17S-diHDHA and PDX inhibit the human platelet aggregation response to collagen at ≥ 100–200 nanomolar concentrations. This inhibition appeared to reflect the ability of these metabolites to a) inhibit the activities of COX-1 and COX-2 thereby blocking the production of TXA2 and b) interfere with the activation of the TXA2 receptor (Thromboxane receptor)  by TXA2. These E,Z,E PUFA are 20- to 100-fold stronger in inhibiting human platelet aggregation than two mono-hydroxyl-containing eicosanoids, 5-HETE and 12-HETE, which contain an E,Z conjugated double bond configuration.

Other dihydroxy-E,Z,E-PUFA 
Other biologically active dihydroxy-E,Z,E-PUFA have not been tested for but, based on the studies cited above, are projected to possess anti-platelet activity. 10S,17S-Dihydroxy-4Z,7Z,11E,13Z,15E,19Z-docosahexaenoic acid. This compound is the 13Z cis-trans isomer of 10-epi-protectin D (which possesses a 13E double bond; see specialized proresolving mediators#DHA-derived protectins/neuroprotectins). Like 10-epi-protectin D1, this docosahexaenoic acid metabolite is formed by stimulated human leukocytes in vitro and possess specialized proresolving mediator (SPM) anti-inflammatory activity. A maresin termed MaR isomer or 7-epi-MaR1, i.e. 7S,14S-dihydroxy-4Z,8E,10Z,12E,16Z,19Z-docosahexaenoic acid (see specialized proresolving mediators#DHA-derived Maresins), likewise possesses SPM activity.

References 

Cell biology
Immunology
Metabolic pathways
Fatty acids